George Bellamy may refer to:

 George Bellamy (musician) (born 1941), English musician with The Tornados
 George Anne Bellamy (1727–1788), Irish actress
 George Bellamy (actor) (1866–1944), English film actor of the silent era
 George W. Bellamy (1867–1920), Lieutenant Governor of Oklahoma